Sheankala Razi (Burmese: ရွီးကုလား ရာဇီ) is one of Burma's highest mountains, and with its height of    and one of the highest mountains in South East Asia. It is located in the northern Burma state of Kachin in an outlying subrange of the Greater Himalayan mountain system near the border with India.

References

Mountains of Myanmar